Endon and Stanley is a civil parish in the district of Staffordshire Moorlands, Staffordshire, England. It contains 48 listed buildings that are recorded in the National Heritage List for England.  Of these, one is at Grade II*, the middle of the three grades, and the others are at Grade II, the lowest grade.   The parish contains the villages of Endon and Stanley and the surrounding area.  The Caldon Canal runs through the parish and makes a junction with its Leek Branch in the parish.  The listed buildings associated with the canal are bridges, locks, a side pond, and a lock keeper's cottage.  Most of the other listed buildings are houses, cottages and associated structures, farmhouses and farm buildings.  The rest of the listed buildings include a church and items in the churchyard, and three mileposts.


Key

Buildings

References

Citations

Sources

Lists of listed buildings in Staffordshire